Karhaiya Shah is a village in the Bhopal district of Madhya Pradesh, India. It is located in the Berasia tehsil.

Demographics 
According to the 2011 census of India, Karhaiya Shah has 281 households. The effective literacy rate (i.e. the literacy rate of population excluding children aged 6 and below) is 59.51%.

References 

Villages in Berasia tehsil